The Cummingsville Formation is a geologic formation in Iowa and Minnesota. It preserves fossils dating back to the Ordovician period.

See also

 List of fossiliferous stratigraphic units in Iowa
 Paleontology in Iowa

References
 

Ordovician Iowa
Ordovician southern paleotropical deposits